The China women's national beach handball team is the national team of China. It is governed by the Chinese Handball Association and takes part in international beach handball competitions.

World Championships results
 2008 – 12th place
 2010 – 11th place
 2012 – 9th place

External links
Official website
IHF profile

Beach handball
Women's national beach handball teams
Beach handball